Ian Bairnson (born 3 August 1953 as John Bairnson) is a Scottish musician, best known for being one of the core members of The Alan Parsons Project. He is a multi-instrumentalist, who has played saxophone and keyboards, although he is best known as a guitarist. He is also known for preferring the sound of a sixpence to a plectrum.

Bairnson was born in Lerwick, Shetland Isles, Scotland.  He grew up in Levenwick, in Shetland, before his family moved to Edinburgh, Midlothian, when he was nine years old, following the death of his father.

He was a session guitarist before joining up in 1973 with former Bay City Rollers musicians David Paton and Billy Lyall in the band Pilot and contributed the harmony guitar parts to their hit single, "Magic." During this time with Pilot, he first collaborated with Alan Parsons, the record producer on their debut self-titled album. It was this relationship that helped incorporate most of the band's members (bassist/lead singer Paton and drummer Stuart Tosh) into the Alan Parsons Project. He played the distinctive guitar solo on the track "I Wouldn't Want to Be Like You" from Parsons' I Robot (1977) album.

As a guitarist, he has been featured on every Alan Parsons Project album, including the 1984 side project Keats.

He has played on Kate Bush's first four albums The Kick Inside (1978) (notably playing the guitar solo on "Wuthering Heights"), Lionheart (1978), Never for Ever (1980) and The Dreaming (1982).

He has also played with the band Bucks Fizz for whom he co-wrote two of their Top 20 hits, "If You Can't Stand the Heat" (1982) and "Run for Your Life" (1983).

In 2009 he appeared on the album of the German bass player Chris Postl, Parzivals Eye. Chris Postl played in RPWL, a German band.

Bairnson lived in Spain from 2003 till 2013, where he had a recording studio and continued working as a session guitarist. He has toured with a number of different bands, the latest being Junk (Bairnson, Pau Chaffer, Sarah Rope and Ángel Celada). Along his session career he has played on more than a hundred albums in different styles. For example: Yvonne Keeley, Joe Cocker, Jon Anderson, Chris DeBurgh, Mick Fleetwood, Neil Diamond. He played live with Sting, Eric Clapton, Beverley Craven and many more.

After moving back to UK in 2013, Bairnson got together with David Paton and produced an album called A Pilot Project where they paid a homage to Eric Woolfson’s legacy. In November 2016 Paton and Bairnson got together again, touring Japan with a Pilot revival and some Alan Parsons Project songs as well.

In 2019, Bairnson added guitar solos to two songs from Alan Parsons' new album, The Secret, specifically the tracks "Years of Glory" and "I Can't Get There from Here".

References

External links

 
 

1953 births
Living people
Musicians from Edinburgh
People from Lerwick
Scottish rock guitarists
Scottish male guitarists
Scottish saxophonists
British male saxophonists
People associated with Shetland
Shetland music
Pilot (band) members
British soft rock musicians
21st-century American saxophonists
21st-century American male musicians
The Alan Parsons Project members